Hortense Calisher (December 20, 1911 – January 13, 2009) was an American writer of fiction and the second female president of the American Academy of Arts and Letters.

Biography

Personal life
Born in New York City, and a graduate of Hunter College High School (1928) and Barnard College (1932), Calisher was the daughter of a young German Jewish immigrant mother and a somewhat older Jewish father from Virginia whose family she described as "volcanic to meditative to fruitfully dull and bound to produce someone interested in character, society, and time".

In 1972, she was a part of the Ms. magazine campaign: “We Have Had Abortions.” The campaign called for an end to "archaic laws" limiting reproductive freedom and encouraged women to share their stories and take action.

Writing style
Calisher involved her closely investigated, penetrating characters in complicated plotlines that unfold with shocks and surprises in allusive, nuanced language with a distinctively elegiac voice, sometimes compared with Eudora Welty, Charles Dickens, Jane Austen, and Henry James. Critics generally considered Calisher a type of neo-realist and often both condemned and praised her for her extensive explorations of characters and their social worlds. Her writing was at odds with the prevailing minimalism typical of fiction writing in the 1970s and 1980s that employed a spartan, nonromantic style without undue expressionism.

The New York Times opined that her "unpredictable turns of phrase, intellectually challenging fictional situations and complex plots captivated and puzzled readers for a half-century. Failure and isolation were themes that ran through her 23 novels and short-story collections: failure of love, marriage, communication, identity. She explored the isolation within families that cannot be avoided yet cannot be faced, isolation imposed by wounds inflicted even in the happiest of households, wounds that shape events for generations. But her peers seemed most intrigued by her distinctive way of telling a story, her filigreed sentences and bold stylistic excursions... Throughout her career as a novelist, opinion tended to split evenly among critics who found her prose style and approach to narrative better suited to short stories [and those who] were mesmerized by her idiosyncratic language and imaginative daring."

Honors and awards
Calisher became the second female president of the American Academy of Arts and Letters in 1987. From 1986 to 1987 she was president of PEN America, the writers' association.

She was a finalist for the National Book Award three times, won O. Henry Awards (for "The Night Club in the Woods" and other works) and the 1986 Janet Heidinger Kafka Prize (for The Bobby Soxer), and was awarded Guggenheim Fellowships in 1952 and 1955. She was elected a Fellow of the American Academy of Arts and Sciences in 1997.

Death
Calisher died on January 13, 2009, aged 97, in Manhattan. She was survived by her husband, Curtis Harnack, and her son, Peter Heffelfinger, from her first marriage to Heaton Bennet Heffelfinger. Calisher was predeceased by her daughter, Bennet Heffelfinger.

Bibliography

Fiction
In the Absence of Angels (short stories 1951)
False Entry (novel 1961)
Tale for the Mirror (novella and short stories 1962)
Textures of Life (novel 1963)
Extreme Magic (novella and short stories 1964)
Journal from Ellipsia (novel 1965)
The Railway Police and The Last Trolley Ride (novellas 1966)
The New Yorkers (novel 1969)
Queenie (novel 1971)
Standard Dreaming (novel 1972)
Eagle Eye (novel 1973)
The Collected Stories of Hortense Calisher (1975, revised 1984)
On Keeping Women (novel 1977)
Mysteries of Motion (novel 1983)
Saratoga, Hot (novella and short stories 1985)
The Bobby-Soxer (novel 1986)
Age (novel 1987)
The Small Bang (novel under the pseudonym of Jack Fenno 1992)
In the Palace of the Movie King (novel 1993)
In the Slammer with  Carol Smith (novel 1997)
The Novellas of Hortense Calisher (1997)
Sunday Jews (novel 2003)

Non-fiction
Herself (autobiography, 1972)
Kissing Cousins: A Memory (memoir, 1988)
Tattoo for a Slave (memoir, 2004)

References

External links

Joyce Carol Oates on Hortense Calisher
Snodgrass, Kathleen. "Hortense Calisher", Jewish Women: A Comprehensive Historical Encyclopedia

1911 births
2009 deaths
20th-century American novelists
American women short story writers
Barnard College alumni
Hunter College High School alumni
Jewish women writers
Jewish American novelists
Fellows of the American Academy of Arts and Sciences
Writers from Manhattan
21st-century American novelists
American women novelists
20th-century American women writers
21st-century American women writers
20th-century American short story writers
21st-century American short story writers
Novelists from New York (state)
Presidents of the American Academy of Arts and Letters
20th-century American Jews
21st-century American Jews